Paul Thalamas (1871–1961) was a French chef.

1871 births
1961 deaths
French chefs